Leiolepis ocellata, the ocellated butterfly lizard, is a species of agamid lizard. It is found in Myanmar and Thailand.

References

Leiolepis
Reptiles of Myanmar
Reptiles of Thailand
Reptiles described in 1971